Suckle may refer to:
Suckling, or Breastfeeding
Suckle (band), Scottish indie pop band
Richard Suckle, film producer